The 2012–13 North Texas Mean Green men's basketball team represented the University of North Texas during the 2012–13 NCAA Division I men's basketball season. The Mean Green, led by first year head coach Tony Benford, played their home games at UNT Coliseum, nicknamed The Super Pit,  and were members of the West Division of the Sun Belt Conference. They finished the season 12–20, 7–13 in Sun Belt play to finish in fourth place in the West Division. They lost in the first round of the Sun Belt tournament to Louisiana–Lafayette.

This was the Mean Green's final season as a member of the Sun Belt. In July, 2013, they will join Conference USA.

Roster

Schedule
 
|-
!colspan=9| Exhibition

|-
!colspan=9| Regular season

|-
!colspan=9| 2013 Sun Belt tournament

References

North Texas Mean Green men's basketball seasons
North Texas